Víctor Valdés Arribas (born 14 January 1982) is a Spanish football coach and former professional player, who played as a goalkeeper. Valdés was considered fiercely competitive and demanding, demonstrating great mental strength and concentration to be alert during long spells of ball domination, and was superb at one-on-ones.

He spent most of his professional career with Barcelona in La Liga, and is regarded as one of the best goalkeepers in the club's history, having appeared in 535 official games for the club and won 21 major titles, notably six La Liga titles and three UEFA Champions League championships. Valdés also won the Zamora Trophy a record five times. He currently holds the club records as goalkeeper with most appearances in the league and in official competition, breaking Andoni Zubizarreta's records during the 2011–12 season. After leaving Barcelona at the end of his contract in July 2014, he joined Manchester United in January 2015. He played rarely at United, and after a brief loan at Standard Liège, he moved on to Middlesbrough. After being released by Middlesbrough at the end of the 2016–17 season, Valdés retired from professional football.

Valdés made his full international debut in 2010 and earned 20 international caps. He was part of the Spain squads which won the 2010 FIFA World Cup and UEFA Euro 2012, and also finished second at the 2013 FIFA Confederations Cup.

Early career 
Born in L'Hospitalet de Llobregat, Barcelona, Catalonia, Valdés started his career with FC Barcelona's youth team when he joined from Peña Cinco Copas on 1 July 1992. That September, he moved with his family to Tenerife and had to leave the club, but returned three years later. After returning, he made quick progress through the youth teams.

Club career

Barcelona 
Valdés made his first team debut against Legia Warszawa in the third qualifying round of the UEFA Champions League on 14 August 2002. The early part of the 2002–03 season saw Valdés play deputy to Argentine international Roberto Bonano, but the arrival of Radomir Antić as the new manager in January 2003 saw regular first-team opportunities for Valdés.

In the 2003–04 season, he emerged as first-choice goalkeeper, and in the 2004–05 season, he played in almost all of Barcelona's matches, helping Barcelona to their first league title in six years. He also won the Zamora Trophy as the best goalkeeper in Spain that season.

In the 2005–06 season, Valdés helped Barça to the continental double in Europe. He played a big part in Barça's 2005–06 UEFA Champions League winning campaign and in the final against Arsenal, he denied Thierry Henry twice from point-blank range to help his side win 2–1 at the Stade de France. His efforts saw him singled out for praise from Barcelona manager at that time Frank Rijkaard. The "Zamora" title, however, eluded him, as Valdés came third after Santiago Cañizares and the winner, José Manuel Pinto.

On 17 June 2007, in the last match of La Liga, Valdés matched a goalkeeping record held by former Barcelona goalkeeper Andoni Zubizarreta by starting, and never being substituted, in all 38 matches of the La Liga season.

Valdés set the Barcelona club record for not conceding a goal in European competition with a clean sheet against Rangers on 7 November 2007, which saw him re-write the Barça record books after not conceding a goal for 466 minutes. Valdés was beaten twice by Lyon captain Juninho through a 45-yard free kick and a late penalty kick at the Stade de Gerland, ending his streak. In the 2006–07 and 2007–08 seasons, however, Barça failed to win a major trophy. On 3 February 2008, Valdés captained Barcelona for the first time in a 1-0 league win at home against Osasuna. On 1 April 2008, Valdés made his 250th appearance for Barcelona.

On 27 May 2009, Barcelona beat Manchester United 2–0 in the 2009 UEFA Champions League Final at the Stadio Olimpico in Rome to complete an unprecedented treble of La Liga, Champions League, and Copa del Rey. In the match, Valdés made two saves from attempts by Cristiano Ronaldo in both halves. In the first half, he saved a long-range free kick, and in the second half, he saved the other from Ronaldo, coming from a tight angle following a low cross from Bulgarian striker Dimitar Berbatov.

On 16 May 2010, Valdés won his fourth league title as Barcelona clinched a second successive Spanish league title with Pep Guardiola's side, ending the season with 99 points.

On 29 August 2011, Valdés played his 410th match with Barcelona and equaled Andoni Zubizarreta's record as Barcelona's goalkeeper with the most appearances.

In 2012, Valdés made a goalkeeping error against Real Madrid in the Supercopa de España that culminated in Ángel Di María scoring a decisive goal and narrowing down Barcelona's two-goal advantage. Real Madrid went on to win the Super Cup in the second leg at the Santiago Bernabéu.

On 1 May 2013, in a 3–0 Champions League semi-final loss to Bayern Munich at Camp Nou, Valdés made his 100th appearance in the competition, becoming the 17th player to do so. Later that month, Valdés announced that he would not renew his Barcelona contract, which was due to expire at the end of the 2013–14 season. He cited the pressure of representing the club and stated that he had declared his wish to leave early enough for the club to find a replacement.

On 26 March 2014, in a 3–0 victory against Celta Vigo, Valdés tore his anterior cruciate ligament in the 22nd minute of the match and was substituted off, and was ruled out for the rest of the season, ending his Barcelona career and ruling him out of the 2014 FIFA World Cup.

Manchester United 
In January 2014, prior to the conclusion of his contract with Barcelona, Valdés signed a pre-contract agreement to join Ligue 1 side Monaco at the end of the season; however, Valdés' injury led to Monaco pulling out of the agreement. On 23 October 2014, Manchester United offered Valdés the chance to complete his rehabilitation from a knee injury and to work his way back to fitness with the club. He was offered a contract in January 2015, and on 8 January signed an 18-month deal, with the option of a further year, as backup for compatriot David de Gea. As part of a compensation package for reneging on their deal with Valdés, Monaco agreed to pay the difference between the £150,000 weekly wage he stood to earn with them and the lower salary offered by Manchester United.

Valdés played his first match since his knee injury on 26 January, featuring for United's Under-21 team in a 2–1 home win over Liverpool. Before the game, he gave a team talk based on the teachings of his former manager Guardiola. He made his first-team debut on 17 May against Arsenal at Old Trafford, replacing the injured De Gea for the final 16 minutes and conceding an own goal by Tyler Blackett for a 1–1 draw. A week later he made his first start for the team in their last game of the season away to Hull City, keeping a clean sheet in a goalless draw which relegated the opponents.

On 15 July 2015, Manchester United manager Louis van Gaal announced that Valdés had been placed on the transfer list after it was claimed he had refused to play in a reserve game. The following month, he was not given a squad number for the upcoming season. A transfer to Turkey's Beşiktaş fell through as personal terms could not be agreed. Despite subsequently being named in Manchester United's Premier League squad, reports confirmed Valdés was only named to conform to Premier League rules and not being offered a way back.

Standard Liège 

On 23 January 2016, Manchester United announced that Valdés would be moving to Belgian club Standard Liège on a six-month loan deal. He made his debut a week later in a 2–0 win at OH Leuven in the Belgian Pro League. On 20 March, Valdés won the 2016 Belgian Cup Final, beating Club Brugge 2–1. His loan spell was cut short on 29 April after the club decided to allow more youth players the opportunity to play in games at the end of the season.

Middlesbrough 
On 7 July 2016, Valdés signed a two-year deal on a free transfer at recently promoted Middlesbrough, managed by compatriot Aitor Karanka. On 13 August 2016, Valdés made his debut in a 1–1 draw against Stoke City. On 22 October 2016, Valdés kept his first clean sheet of the season in a 0–0 draw against Arsenal. The club entered the relegation zone in March 2017 after a 2–0 loss to Stoke City, with Karanka sacked later that month. Valdés, as well as fellow goalkeeper Brad Guzan, left the club on 1 July 2017. Although he had offers from several clubs in Spain to prolong his career, Valdés retired from professional football in August 2017; after remaining without a club for the first half of the 2017–18 season, he later confirmed his official retirement in January 2018.

International career 

On 16 August 2005, Valdés was called up for a friendly game against Uruguay, but did not take the field. After being overlooked by various coaches of the Spanish national side for several years, on 20 May 2010, he was included by Vicente del Bosque in Spain's final 23-man squad for the 2010 FIFA World Cup in South Africa as the second-choice goalkeeper behind captain Iker Casillas wearing the number 12 shirt.

On 3 June 2010, Valdés earned his first cap, starting in a friendly match between Spain and South Korea at Tivoli-Neu in Innsbruck, Austria. Valdés was part of the Spanish squads that won the 2010 FIFA World Cup and UEFA Euro 2012, despite not playing in either tournament.

He was also in the Spanish squad which reached the final of the 2013 FIFA Confederations Cup in Brazil. His sole appearance in a major tournament came in their last group game, keeping a clean sheet in a 3–0 win over Nigeria at the Estádio Castelão in Fortaleza.

Style of play 
In his prime, Valdés was considered to be a successful and generally high quality goalkeeper, albeit somewhat inconsistent, and is regarded as one of Barcelona's best ever goalkeepers. An authoritative presence in the area, with good reflexes, handling, positioning, and shot-stopping abilities, he was known for his agility and composure in goal, as well as his ability to produce decisive saves, in particular after not being tested for long stretches of time; however, he was also prone to errors on occasion, in particular in his early career. In addition to his goalkeeping abilities, he was known in particular for his vision, footwork, distribution, control and skill with the ball at his feet, which enabled him to play the ball out on the ground or launch an attack from the back; throughout his career, he also stood out for his intelligence, ability to read the game, and his speed and bravery when coming off his line to claim the ball on the ground in one on one situations, and also excelled at anticipating opponents outside his area who had beaten the offside trap, and often functioned as a sweeper-keeper.

Coaching career 
On 1 June 2018, Valdés returned to football as a manager by acquiring his UEFA Pro Licence alongside compatriots such as Xavi, Raúl and Xabi Alonso. Valdés started coaching amateur side ED Moratalaz's youth ranks, where he achieved two regional titles. On 19 July 2019, Valdés returned to Barcelona to coach its Juvenil A side. His return, however, was short-lived, as he was sacked on 7 October due to a private scandal with La Masia director Patrick Kluivert. Despite dismissal, Valdés returned to the touchline in May 2020, when he was appointed the manager of UA Horta. He left in January 2021 in order to 'focus on Joan Laporta's presidential project' as reported by El Mundo Deportivo. Laporta's idea is to make Valdes part of the new board if he wins the presidential election in March 2021.

Personal life 
Valdés was born to José Manuel Valdés and Águeda Arribas and has two brothers, Ricardo and Álvaro. He married his long-time partner, Colombian model Yolanda Cardona, in June 2017. The couple have two sons, Dylan and Kai, and a daughter, Vera.

Career statistics

Club 
Sources:

Notes

International

Honours 
Barcelona
La Liga: 2004–05, 2005–06, 2008–09, 2009–10, 2010–11, 2012–13
Copa del Rey: 2008–09, 2011–12
Supercopa de España: 2005, 2006, 2009, 2010, 2011, 2013
UEFA Champions League: 2005–06, 2008–09, 2010–11
UEFA Super Cup: 2009, 2011
FIFA Club World Cup: 2009, 2011

Standard Liège
Belgian Cup: 2015–16
Spain
FIFA World Cup: 2010
UEFA European Championship: 2012
Individual
 Zamora Trophy: 2004–05, 2008–09, 2009–10, 2010–11, 2011–12
 La Liga Best Goalkeeper: 2009–10, 2010–11
 ESM Team of the Year: 2010–11
 FIFA FIFPro World XI 4th team: 2013
 Middlesbrough Player of the Month: October 2016
Orders
Gold Medal of the Royal Order of Sporting Merit: 2011

See also 
 List of footballers with 100 or more UEFA Champions League appearances

References

External links 

 
 National team data at BDFutbol
 2010 FIFA World Cup profile
 
 
 
 

1982 births
Living people
Spanish footballers
Association football goalkeepers
FC Barcelona C players
FC Barcelona Atlètic players
FC Barcelona players
Manchester United F.C. players
Standard Liège players
Middlesbrough F.C. players
Tercera División players
Segunda División B players
La Liga players
Premier League players
Belgian Pro League players
UEFA Champions League winning players
Spain youth international footballers
Spain under-21 international footballers
Spain international footballers
Catalonia international footballers
2010 FIFA World Cup players
UEFA Euro 2012 players
2013 FIFA Confederations Cup players
FIFA World Cup-winning players
Footballers from L'Hospitalet de Llobregat
UEFA European Championship-winning players
Spanish expatriate footballers
Spanish expatriate sportspeople in Belgium
Spanish expatriate sportspeople in England
Expatriate footballers in Belgium
Expatriate footballers in England
Spanish football managers
FC Barcelona non-playing staff